Njoki Ngumi is a Kenyan filmmaker and doctor.  As a member of arts collaborative The Nest Collective, Ngumi has been involved in film, music and other art projects in Kenya.  She is the screenwriter of Stories of Our Lives, a 2014 film recounting the experiences of LGBT Kenyans that was awarded the Teddy Award Jury Prize in 2015.

Ngumi was also involved in the #MyAlwaysExperience Twitter protest, claiming multinational companies produce substandard feminine products for the Kenyan market. She was among those who met with Procter & Gamble Kenya in 2019 to voice concerns, ultimately leading to an investigation by the Kenya Bureau of Standards.

References

Living people
21st-century Kenyan physicians
Kenyan screenwriters
Year of birth missing (living people)